William Oliver Blackmore (born 1 October 2001) is an English footballer who plays as a goalkeeper for  club Peterborough United.

Career
Blackmore graduated through Peterborough United's academy and signed a long-term contract in February 2021. He made his senior debut as a substitute in a 4–1 League One win over Doncaster Rovers on 9 May 2021.

Career statistics

References

External links

2001 births
Living people
English footballers
Association football goalkeepers
Peterborough United F.C. players
English Football League players